The San Ildefonso de Toledo Parish Church, commonly known as Guiguinto Church, is an 18th-century, Baroque church located along the McArthur highway, Brgy. Poblacion, Guiguinto, Bulacan, Philippines. The parish church, under the aegis of Saint Ildephonsus, Bishop of Toledo, is under the jurisdiction of the Roman Catholic Diocese of Malolos.

History

Parish history
Guiguinto was founded by the Augustinian Friars as a visita of nearby town Caruya (now Balagtas) on 31 October 1607 and placed under the advocation of Saint Ildephonsus although it has been mentioned in the records as early as 1591. On 31 October 1617, it was annexed to the parish of Bulakan. In 1621, the convent of Guiguinto was declared independent from its matrix with Father Bernabe de Villalobos as first parish priest. However, it was again attached to the convent of Bigaa in 1633. Records tell that the convent of Guiguinto was not as affluent as its neighbors. In 1641, it was exempted from paying its dues to the San Agustin Monastery in Manila due to lack of funds. A similar incident occurred in 1669.

Edifice history
The exact date of construction of the present parochial structure could not be identified clearly. It is assumed that the ministers of Guiguinto were only able to erect parochial structures after 1621. Moreover, records tell that the convent of Guiguinto applied for the collection of rice for the construction of a church in 1734. This leads to the estimate that construction of the present church may have started by the latter part of the 17th century but was still unfinished by 1734. Father Buzeta, parish priest in 1832, built the road to Bigaa and the Catholic cemetery in 1848. The church and convent of Guiguinto sustained great damage from an earthquake in 1863. Repair works were still being conducted in 1864.

Between 1955 and the early 1960s, the church of Guiguinto was renovated under Father Carlos E. Bernardo. The remodeling, which involved the plastering of the exterior, repainting of the entire structure and construction of a new altarpiece, reportedly costs ₱ 50, 000.00.

Architecture
The façade is divided into three vertical sections by four sets of Doric columns. The columns, which is said to be added for ornamentation purposes, supports a triangular pediment adorned by an oculus and volutes on the end. Geometric motifs can also be found on the plastered side portals. Saint's niches, stained glass and an Augustinian emblem add details to the otherwise plain façade. To the right of the church rises the four-level, octagonal bell tower which features similar designs as the façade. Two bells can be found on the tower: one cast by Hilario Sunico in 1889 and was installed by Father Pedro Quiros and a smaller one dating 1887.

References

External links
 Official Website of the San Ildefonso Parish - Guiguinto
 

Spanish Colonial architecture in the Philippines
Roman Catholic churches in Bulacan
Baroque architecture in the Philippines
Churches in the Roman Catholic Diocese of Malolos